The Governor General's Academic Medal is awarded to the student graduating with the highest grade point average from a Canadian high school, college or university program. They are presented by the educational institution on behalf of the Governor General.  These medals are not part of the Canadian Honours System. Since 2020, none of the medals have been created, and a placeholder has been located on the Governor General's website stating that the medals will be delivered sometime in the future. While consistently noting how Governor General Mary Simon holds the program in "high regard," as of December 2021, the Governor General's office said the medals would be sent in "summer 2022;" as of April 2022, the office said "fall 2022;" and, as of December 2022, the office said "in the months to come."

History

The medals were created by Lord Dufferin, Canada's third Governor General after Confederation in 1873.

Criteria

To maintain a spirit of universality across the country, the medals are awarded on academic marks only, regardless of the less tangible aspects of the student's life, such as good citizenship, moral behaviour and, volunteer and community work. The Chancellery of Honours administers the Governor General's Academic Medal. Canadian citizenship is not a prerequisite for the award.

Famous recipients
Famous recipients include:

 Robert Bourassa – Premier of Quebec and Quebec Liberal leader
 Andrée-Anne Dupuis-Bourret – French-Canadian artist
 Jean-Claude Bradley – chemist who coined the term Open Notebook Science
 Kim Campbell – federal Progressive Conservative Leader and Prime Minister
 Robert F. Christy – Canadian-American theoretical physicist who worked on the Manhattan Project
 Adrienne Clarkson – journalist and Governor General of Canada
 Tommy Douglas – Premier of Saskatchewan, leader of the CCF and federal NDP
 Sylvia Fedoruk -  Physicist, medical physicist, curler and the 17th Lieutenant Governor of Saskatchewan
 Sylvia Hahn – Canadian artist and head of the art department at the Royal Ontario Museum
 W. G. Hardy – Canadian Classics professor, writer, International Ice Hockey Federation president
 Mabel Gweneth Humphreys – 20th-century Canadian-American mathematician
 Rachel Marsden – journalist, Fox News host, and internationally syndicated columnist
 Gabrielle Roy – French-Canadian author, three-time winner
 Duane Rousselle – Canadian Sociologist and Psychoanalyst
 Robert Stanfield – federal Progressive Conservative Leader and Leader of the Opposition
 Pierre Trudeau – Prime Minister of Canada and federal Liberal Party leader
 Jesse Thistle - Author and Assistant Professor
 Paul Vermeersch – Canadian poet

Categories

Governor General's Academic Medals are awarded at four levels.
 Bronze – secondary school level
 Collegiate Bronze – post-secondary, diploma level
 Silver – undergraduate level
 Gold – graduate level

There is no monetary award associated with the Medal.

See also
 List of awards presented by the Governor General of Canada
 Dufferin Medal

External links 
Academic Medals on the Canadian Governor General's web site

References

Governor General's Awards